Qaleh-ye Arjanavand (also Romanized as Qal‘eh-ye Arjanāvand and Qal‘eh-ye Arjenāvand; also known as Ghal‘eh Arjanavand and Qal‘eh Arjawand) is a village in Saruq Rural District, Saruq District, Farahan County, Markazi Province, Iran. At the 2006 census, its population was 462, in 99 families.

References 

Populated places in Farahan County